Cífer is a municipality (village) in the Trnava District, Slovakia. It has a population of 4,610.

Archaeological finds from the Neolithic, Bronze Age, Roman Period, and early Slavic period have been made in the village. The first written mention of the settlement dates from 1291. It received town status in the early 18th century, but it has lost it since then.

Prominent residents 
 Marcel Gery, bronze medal-winner at the 1992 Olympic Games in Barcelona
 Eduard Mahler, Jewish Hungarian archaeologist
 Ladislav Lučenič, Slovak musician

Partner village
  Prellenkirchen (Austria)

See also
 List of municipalities and towns in Slovakia

References

Genealogical resources

The records for genealogical research are available at the state archive "Statny Archiv in Bratislava, Slovakia"

 Roman Catholic church records (births/marriages/deaths): 1666-1898 (parish A)
 Lutheran church records (births/marriages/deaths): 1666-1896 (parish B)
 Reformated church records (births/marriages/deaths): 1787-1924 (parish B)

External links
 Official website of village
 Official website of football club ŠK Cífer
Surnames of living people in Cifer

Villages and municipalities in Trnava District
Shtetls